Andaman and Nicobar Islands, a union territory of India, has an international-designated airport and a few airstrips for military and emergency purposes. The Veer Savarkar International Airport in Port Blair is jointly operated by the Airports Authority of India and Indian Air Force while the aerodromes at Car Nicobar, Campbell Bay and Diglipur are operated by the Indian Air Force only.

A new terminal is being constructed at Veer Savarkar International Airport in Port Blair to enhance the capacity of the airport amid increased tourism. The new terminal is stated to be completed by October 2022. Under the Government of India's UDAN scheme, 3 airstrips and 4 water aerodromes are proposed to be developed to improve inter-connectivity among the islands and increase tourism.

List
The list includes the airports in Andaman and Nicobar Islands with their respective ICAO and IATA codes.

References

Andaman and Nicobar Islands
Buildings and structures in the Andaman and Nicobar Islands